Clara Louisa Wells (29 October 1838 – 28 December 1925) was an American writer and inventor.

Biography
She was born in Maine, studied in Boston and took a degree in science. She had very good knowledge of Latin, Greek, Italian and French. 
She started work with her first publication, "Alban Hills - Vol. I - Frascati". Throughout her life she continued to write in Europe - (France) and America.

Near the end of her life she wrote a series of peace pamphlets on the League of Nations and European politic.

One copy of each of her French works is kept in the public library  "Médiathèque Publique et Universitaire" de Valence (Drome) - France.

Publications 
 
 
 
  
 1906 Arrondissement of Valence in the Department of the Drome - France - ed. L'imprimerie valentinoise - Valence - Drome - Pos. A 525 Archives départementales de Valence - France
 1915 A League between Nation - ed. L'imprimerie valentinoise - Valence (Drome) France - Series:Pamphlets on peace. No. 89 - LC Classification: JX1937.P3 n. 89.

Inventions

1897-05-29 Improvements in Aerial Routes, and connected with the Distillation, Storage, and Supply of Water.  List of UK Intellectual Property Office - Publication info:GB189613715 (1)
1897-10-16 Center providing Means for Controlling and Utilizing Volcanic, Aqueous, and Meteorological Forces.  List of UK Intellectual Property Office - Publication info:GB189712836 (1)
1899-05-13 Secure Modes of Exploring the Cold and Hot Regions of the Earth by Means of Centers of Elevation and Depression, with Reference to Volcanic, Aqueous, and Meteorological Forces, and of Routes Suspended with or without Ballons.  List of UK Intellectual Property Office - Publication info: GB189815679 (1)
1909-10-22 Improvements in, and relating to, the Propulsion, by Balloons, of Ships and other Vessels Navigable in Water.  List of UK Intellectual Property Office-  Publication info:GB190822417 (1)

External links
(1)  Inventions info from European Patent Office
Stefano Paolucci, Clara Wells, risolto lo storico mistero, in "Il Tuscolo", XXIII, n. 199, 28 ottobre 2016.

1838 births
1925 deaths
19th-century American writers
20th-century American writers
19th-century American women writers
20th-century American women writers
People from Hallowell, Maine
Writers from Maine